Derrick Baskin (born November 10, 1975) is an actor best known for his role of "Comfort Counselor" Mitch Mahoney in the popular Broadway show The 25th Annual Putnam County Spelling Bee.

Baskin also played the role of "Jetsam" in the Broadway version of The Little Mermaid. He originated the role of "Gator" in Memphis and also appeared in the filmed version of the musical, Memphis: Direct from Broadway by Broadway Worldwide. He received a Tony Award nomination for playing Otis Williams in Ain't Too Proud.

Baskin has a BA in Biology from Hampton University.

Theatre credits

Filmography

Film

Television

Web

Awards and nominations

References

External links

Living people
American male musical theatre actors
American male stage actors
Hampton University alumni
1975 births